TIAA Bank is an American diversified financial services organization under the auspices of New York-based TIAA. Based in Jacksonville, Florida, TIAA Bank provides banking, mortgages, and investing services throughout the United States. The institution was formed through the combination of TIAA Direct, TIAA's former banking division, and EverBank. The new name became official on June 4, 2018, following EverBank's acquisition by TIAA in July 2017.

History
Originally named Teachers Insurance and Annuity Association of America, TIAA was created in 1918 by Andrew Carnegie, a Scottish-American industrialist, business magnate, and philanthropist known for building Carnegie Hall in New York, NY, and for the 2,509 public and university libraries whose construction he funded across the U.S. and beyond.

TIAA reached a deal to buy EverBank for $2.5 billion in cash on August 8, 2016. On June 12, 2017, the company officially became "TIAA FSB Holdings, Inc. formerly known as EverBank Financial Corp". Nearly a year later, TIAA began rebranding all of its banking activities under the TIAA Bank name on June 4, 2018.

On Nov 3, 2022, TIAA entered into an agreement to spin off TIAA Bank to private interests.

Community involvement
Since 2018, the bank has donated nearly 9 million dollars to over 100 charitable organizations based upon 4 main pillars: education, environment, hunger and community building. TIAA Bank has given support to organizations such as the following:
Habitat for Humanity
Ronald McDonald House Charities
United Way
Take Stock in Children
Junior Achievement
The McKenzie Noelle Wilson Foundation

TIAA Bank Field

Originally named Jacksonville Municipal Stadium, and later Alltel Stadium, the home of the Jacksonville Jaguars got a new name on the eve of the 2010 training camp, when EverBank Financial Corp and the Jaguars introduced EverBank Field on July 27, 2010. The partnership included a five-year naming rights agreement, which was extended by another 10 years in 2014. 

On June 4, 2018, EverBank became TIAA Bank and the stadium was renamed TIAA Bank Field.

See also

 TIAA Bank Center
 TIAA Bank Field

References

External links
TIAA Bank's Website

TIAA
Banks established in 2018
2018 establishments in Florida
Companies based in Jacksonville, Florida
Banks based in Jacksonville, Florida
American companies established in 2018